The 1962 BRSCC British Saloon Car Championship, was the fifth season of the championship. It began at Snetterton on 14 April and finished at Oulton Park on 1 September. Rhodesian driver John Love became the first non-British BSCC winner, driving a Morris Mini Cooper and an Austin Mini Cooper, making it the second consecutive championship win for a Mini driver.

Calendar & Winners
All races were held in the United Kingdom. Overall winners in bold.

The final race at Brands Hatch did not follow the same class structure as the preceding events. There were additional classes with 1300 & 1600cc engine capacity limits which were won by  Alan Foster/ Andrew Hedges and  Peter Procter/ Peter Harper, respectively.

Championship results

References

External links 
Official website of the British Touring Car Championship

British Touring Car Championship seasons
British Saloon Car Championship